was a Japanese statesman, courtier and politician during the Heian period.

Career
Tokihira was a minister under Emperor Daigo.
 891 (Kanpyō 3, 3rd month): Tokihira was given a rank which was the equivalent of sangi.
 897 (Kanpyō 9, 6th month): Tokihira was made Dainagon with a rank equal to that of a General of the Left.
 899 (Shōtai 2): Tokihira was named Sadaijin
 900 (Shōtai 3):  Tokihira accused Sugawara no Michizane of plotting against the emperor.  This led to  Michizane's exile to the Dazaifu in Kyūshū.

 909 (Engi  9, 4th month): Tokihira died at age 39.  He was honored with posthumous rank and titles.

Genealogy
This member of the Fujiwara clan was the son of Fujiwara no Mototsune.  Tokihira had two brothers: Fujiwara no Tadahira and Fujiwara no Nakahira.

Father:  Fujiwara no Mototsune
Mother: Daughter of Imperial Prince Saneyasu
Wife: Princess Renshi (廉子女王), daughter of Imperial Prince Motoyasu
1st Son: Fujiwara no Yasutada (藤原保忠; 890-936)
Daughter: Fujiwara no Hōshi (藤原 褒子), consort of Emperor Uda
Daughter: Fujiwara no Hitoshi (藤原 仁善子)
Wife: Daughter of Minamoto Jin
2nd Son: Fujiwara no Akitadata (藤原顕忠; 898-965）
Wife: Daughter of Ariwara no Muneyana
3rd Son: Fujiwara no Atsutada (藤原敦忠; 906-943)
Wife: Unknown
Daughter:  Concubine of Fujiwara no Saneyori
Daughter: Wife of Imperial Prince Atsumi
Daughter:  Wife of Imperial Prince Yoshiakira

Selected works
In a statistical overview derived from writings by and about Fujiwara no Tokihira, OCLC/WorldCat encompasses roughly 35 works in 69 publications in 1 language and 122 library holdings.

 Sandai jitsuroku  (三代實).
 Engi shiki  ( 延喜式).

See also
 Six National Histories
 Sugawara no Michizane
 Tenjin (kami)

Notes

References
 Brinkley, Frank and Dairoku Kikuchi. (1915). A History of the Japanese People from the Earliest Times to the End of the Meiji Era. New York: Encyclopædia Britannica. OCLC 413099
 Nussbaum, Louis-Frédéric and Käthe Roth. (2005).  Japan encyclopedia. Cambridge: Harvard University Press. ;  OCLC 58053128
 Titsingh, Isaac. (1834). Nihon Odai Ichiran; ou,  Annales des empereurs du Japon.  Paris: Royal Asiatic Society, Oriental Translation Fund of Great Britain and Ireland. OCLC 5850691

871 births
909 deaths
Kuge
People of Heian-period Japan
Deified Japanese people
Kabuki characters